Henry Benton Sayler (March 31, 1836 – June 18, 1900) was an American lawyer and politician who served one term as a U.S. Representative from Indiana from 1873 to 1875. He was a cousin of Milton Sayler, who also served in the  U.S. House of Representatives.

Biography 
Born in Montgomery County, Ohio, Sayler moved to Clinton County, Indiana.
He attended the common schools of the county.
He studied law.
He was admitted to the bar in 1856 and commenced practice in Eaton, Ohio.
During the Civil War served in the Union Army as lieutenant, captain, and major.

Congress 
Sayler was elected as a Republican to the Forty-third Congress (March 4, 1873 – March 3, 1875).
He was not a candidate for renomination in 1874.

Later career and death 
He served as judge of the twenty-eighth judicial circuit court of Indiana 1875–1900.
He died in Huntington, Indiana, June 18, 1900 and was interred in Mount Hope Cemetery.

References
 Retrieved on 2009-5-12

External links

1836 births
1900 deaths
People from Montgomery County, Ohio
People of Indiana in the American Civil War
Union Army officers
People from Clinton County, Indiana
19th-century American politicians
Ohio lawyers
People from Huntington, Indiana

Republican Party members of the United States House of Representatives from Indiana